Alanjareq (also Romanized as Alanjāreq; also known as Alenjālīq, Alīkhāraq, Alīnjāraq, Alīnjāreq, and Irinjālik) is a village in Kandovan Rural District, Kandovan District, Meyaneh County, East Azerbaijan Province, Iran. At the 2006 census, its population was 278, in 82 families.

References 

Populated places in Meyaneh County